Coney Beach Pleasure Park is a small amusement park in Porthcawl, Mid Glamorgan in Wales, in operation since 1920. Throughout its history, the park's period of operation is from end of February of each year up until 5 November. Originally built to entertain American troops returning from World War I, the park was named as a tribute to the famous New York amusement park on Coney Island.

History

Early Days
Constructed on the town's old ballast tip, the park's roots date back to April 1920, when a Figure Eight wooden roller coaster was relocated from West Glamorgan and initially operated from an old World War I aircraft hangar. This particular attraction continued to operate until July 1981, when it was dropped as part of an attempt to modernise the look of the park for contemporary audiences of the 1980s. Other attractions in the early days included a bandstand on the town green nearby, an outdoor and indoor skating rink, three cinemas, a Pierrot stage, and donkey and pony rides on the adjacent beach.

Another notable ride, the Water Chute (similar to the now defunct Vikingar at Pleasure Beach Blackpool (then named Blackpool Pleasure Beach), opened in 1932 and operated until 1995. This particular attraction was unique and it dominated the skyline nearest the beach.

In September 1939, following the outbreak of World War II, the park was temporarily closed for several years as the 15th battalion of the Welsh Regiment was based at the Coney Beach site; later on, the Belgian Brigade's armoured car division were also billeted there until the unit left Porthcawl in 1942.

Normal service was resumed in April 1946 after World War II came to an end.

Commercial peak
Porthcawl had already been a popular holiday destination for locals in South Wales for many years, and the park attained modest popularity throughout the second half of the 1940s as the UK recovered from the after-effects of World War II. However, it was in the 1950s that the park experienced its first boom in popularity; events such as boxing matches, firework displays and aerial acrobat shows organised by the Royal Air Force drew in crowds of hundreds from all over Wales, and, as transport links improved further following the extension of the M4 motorway into South Wales in the 1960s and 1970s, Porthcawl experienced a dramatic rise in tourists visiting the area from all over the UK, and the park was one of the town's leading attractions. Further events, such as open air markets, circuses, and professional darts and snooker tournaments/exhibitions were staged. By the late 1980s, thousands of people visited the park from all over the world as more road and rail improvements in South Wales saw easier access from Cardiff Wales Airport.

The 1990s, however, saw a downturn in the park's fortunes. The Water Chute was closed in 1995 (but not demolished until 2000), mainly due to an accident where a gantry fell onto the track, which had occurred due to the high winds in April 1994 and caused a number of cars to be derailed, killing a young boy in the process; the stigma of the accident saw the numbers of people who used the ride to rapidly decline hence the demolition. This accident was the second in a chain of nine high-profile incidents from 1994 onwards that led to repeated negative publicity for the park, in turn causing the number of visitors to drop sharply by 1998.

Rides
 Beach Party
 Mega Spin
 Paratrooper
 Ghost Train 
 Miami Madness
 Thunderdome Waltzer
 Wacky Worm Roller Coaster 
 Sizzler Twist
 Fantasia
 Dodgems
 Go-Karts
 Rotor
 Carousel
 Bounce Jump & Smile
 Go Gator Junior Coaster
 Jumbo Circus Fun House
 Nessi Family Coaster

Notable Past Rides

Incidents/controversy

Coney Beach had a reasonable record of safety between its opening in 1920 and its commercial heyday between the 1950s and 1980s, when it often attracted several thousand visitors per week in the summer months.

From 1994 to 2000, Coney Beach was the scene of several serious and, in one case, fatal incidents:

 1994 - A 14-year-old girl fractured three ribs and injured her lungs when she was thrown 40 feet out of a brand new £300,000 Top Flip ride at the park. Three other people were injured in the incident and were treated for stomach, neck and leg injuries on its first day in service, just hours after launch. The incident occurred only hours after the ride had been tested. The ride was immediately dismantled.
 1994 - A 9-year-old boy died in an incident on the site's Water Chute, less than six weeks after the aforementioned accident on the Top Flip ride. Poor weather conditions contributed to a gantry falling onto the track, causing several carriages to derail. It was also revealed in the aftermath that there had been an accident on this ride a year prior to this one where three passengers were injured when their boat left the tracks and fell nearly 6 ft, but this had not been reported because it had been caused by drunken passengers deliberately shifting their weight and causing the boat to go off course.
 1994 - Two months after the accident on the Top Flip ride, and less than two weeks after the fatal incident on the Water Chute, the park again received negative publicity when the 'Blizzard' roller-coaster overshot on its exit run, injuring three passengers and leaving several more severely shaken. Unlike the previous two incidents in 1994, this accident was caused by human error, as the ride attendant was not paying attention and forgot to put the brakes on when the ride was supposed to have stopped. The employee was subsequently dismissed from the park. The Blizzard, in operation since the late 1980s, was eventually withdrawn in 2004 amongst reports that the speed of the roller-coaster comparable with size of the ride was causing many riders to experience shaking to the head.
 2000 - A 17-year-old girl suffered a fractured skull when a large bolt fell out of the ‘Skymaster’ ride and hit her head as she walked past.
 2002 - The park suffered a severe blaze, the cause of which was suspicious.
 2004 - A sex offender who had been ordered to stay away from children by a court, got a job at the theme park just 2 weeks later. When this was reported in the local press, he was immediately dismissed.
 2006 - Two police officers were injured when several young troublemakers turned aggressive when ejected from the park.
 2007 - The body of one of several young adults who died during a spate of suicides in the Bridgend area was found in a vacant warehouse at the park.

Many visitors and critics from local and national press complained in the 2000s that the park did not properly maintain or care for its older rides, instead focusing solely on its more new additions, compromising the safety of users. Additionally, the rides ‘Megablitz’ and ‘Nessi’ were regularly reported in the local press to create very sharp impacts on the rider and to be prone to shaking the rider's head rather vigorously throughout the duration of the ride’. However, no serious incidents resulting from maintenance problems on any of the rides occurred since the 'Skymaster' accident in 2000.

References

External links
 Coney Beach Official website

Amusement parks in Wales
1920 establishments in Wales
Tourist attractions in Bridgend County Borough